Mensen Ernst (1795 – 22 January 1843) was born as Mons Monsen Øyri, in the summer of 1795 in the village of Fresvik along the Sognefjord, in the municipality of Vik in Sogn og Fjordane county, Norway.  He was a road runner and ultramarathonist and one of the first sport professionals and employed as a courier. He made his living running, mainly through placing bets on himself being able to run a certain distance within a period of time.

Trips
It took him 14 days starting on 11 June 1832—averaging over  a day. On his trips he took very little rest and never slept on a bed. When he did rest it was short naps, between ten and fifteen minutes at a time, and he took them standing or leaning against a tree with a handkerchief over his face. His last trip started in Bad Muskau, and went through Jerusalem and Cairo, from where he intended to run along the Nile until he found its source. He died in January 1843 from dysentery, close to the border between Egypt and Sudan, where he was buried a few days later. The place of his death is now buried by the Aswan Dam.

Notes

External links
Mensen Ernst - Original Globetrotter
A Wonderful Runner - NY Times, 1879
Mensen Ernst - King of the Runners

1795 births
1843 deaths
Norwegian male long-distance runners
Norwegian ultramarathon runners
Endurance games
Male ultramarathon runners